Mismo! is the sixteenth studio album of the Filipino trio Apo Hiking Society. It's an 11-track album released in 1999 under Universal Records.

Track listing
Take This Step (3:59)
Isang Dangkal (4:15)
Missing Parts (4:34)
Mamahalin Mo Pa Kaya Ako (3:38)
Telephone Pal (3:58)
Beginner (2:39)
Pito ni Juan (4:36)
Pula, Puti, Ginto, Itim (5:07)
Dong (3:01)
Paggising Mo Bukas (4:00)
Gusto (3:48)

Related links
The Official Apo Hiking Society Website 

APO Hiking Society albums
1999 albums